Ben Hardy may refer to:

 Ben Hardy (actor) (born 1991), English actor
 Ben Hardy (motorcycle builder) (died 1994), American custom motorcycle designer
 Benjamin Gower Hardy (1898 – 1944), Australian recipient of the George Cross
 Benjamin Hardy, Australian professional volleyballer